The anatomical neck of the humerus is obliquely directed, forming an obtuse angle with the body of the humerus. It represents the fused epiphyseal plate.

Structure 
 
The anatomical neck divides the head of the humerus from the greater and lesser tubercles of the humerus It gives attachment to the capsular ligament of the shoulder joint except at the upper inferior-medial aspects. It is best marked in the lower half of its circumference; in the upper half it is represented by a narrow groove separating the head of the humerus from the two tubercles, the greater tubercle and the lesser tubercle. It affords attachment to the articular capsule of the shoulder-joint, and is perforated by numerous vascular foramina.

Additional images

References

External links
 
 

Skeletal system
Humerus